Atlasi (Qa'em) Square is a square in north central Shiraz, Iran where Azadi Boulevard, Hejrat Boulevard and Rabbani Boulevard meet.

Transportation

Streets
 Azadi Boulevard
 Hejrat Boulevard
 Rabbani Boulevard
 Golestan Boulevard

Buses
 Route 2
 Route 14
 Route 24
 Route 73
 Route 76

Streets in Shiraz